Bernd Gries (born 26 May 1968) is a retired German football striker.

References

1968 births
Living people
German footballers
FC 08 Homburg players
SV Elversberg players
Bundesliga players
2. Bundesliga players
Association football forwards